At the 2012 Summer Olympics Parade of Nations  of the 2012 London Olympics, athletes and officials from each participating country paraded into the Olympic Stadium preceded by their national flag to the sound of iconic British modern music. Each flag bearer was chosen by each nation's National Olympic Committee or by the delegation of athletes.

Parade order
By tradition and IOC guidelines, Greece entered first, as the nation of origin of the ancient and the host of the 1896 Summer Olympics modern Olympic Games. The host nation Great Britain (as the United Kingdom is recognized at the Games) brought up the end of the procession. The other nations followed Greece in alphabetical order by name in the language of the host country (English) except for a few instances. As each national delegation entered accompanied by music, the national name was announced in French and English (the official languages of the Olympics).

National name exceptions included shortened, more formal or alternative names, sometimes due to political or naming disputes. Macedonia entered as "Former Yugoslav Republic of Macedonia'" because of the naming dispute with Greece. The Republic of China (commonly known as Taiwan) entered with the compromised name and flag of "Chinese Taipei" under T so that they did not enter together with conflicting People's Republic of China (commonly known as China), which entered as the "People's Republic of China" under C. The Republic of the Congo entered as just "Congo" while the Democratic Republic of the Congo entered with its full name. Similarly South Korea entered as "Republic of Korea" under K while North Korea entered as "Democratic People's Republic of Korea". The British Virgin Islands entered under B while the United States Virgin Islands entered as simply the "Virgin Islands", under V. Iran, Micronesia, Moldova, Laos, Brunei and the United States all entered under their formal names, respectively "Islamic Republic of Iran", "Federated States of Micronesia", "Republic of Moldova", "Lao People's Democratic Republic", "Brunei Darussalam" and "United States of America". For the first time in many years, Libyan athletes marched as "Libya", and not "Libyan Arab Jamahiriya" as Libya was known during the reign of Muammar Gaddafi.

Parade

Each delegation was led by a flagbearer (listed below), accompanied by a child volunteer carrying a copper petal (camera-left) and a young lady carrying a sign with the country's English name (camera-right). The copper petal was engraved with the name of the nation and would later be used to build the cauldron for the Olympic flame. The volunteer carrying the sign wore a dress constructed with fabric imprinted with images of Olympic volunteers, including those who had not been chosen. Each nation's flag was planted as it arrived at the model of Glastonbury Tor.

Netherlands Antilles was ineligible to participate independently in the parade, as its National Olympic Committee was unrecognized by the IOC due to the 2010 dissolution of the Netherlands Antilles. Team Dutch Antilleans paraded by default under the Olympic flag, together with a South Sudanese runner whose newly independent country did not yet have an Olympic committee.

Notable were the debut female Olympic athletes from Saudi Arabia, Qatar and Brunei.

The Team India entered the stadium jointly led by a woman dressed in a red top and blue trousers, who was not part of its team. In India this incident received media attention, but London officials downplayed concerns saying that she was Madhura Nagendra, a volunteer who had been security screened. Some media outlets later identified her as Madhura Honey, a graduate of Communications and Media Studies from Christ College in Bangalore. The Indian team's acting chef-de-mission Muralidharan Raja filed a protest with organisers.

Countries and flagbearers
Below is a list of parading countries and their announced flag bearer, in the same order as the parade.  This is sortable by country name, flag bearer's name, or flag bearer's sport.  Names are given in the form officially designated by the IOC.

Notes

References

Parade of Nations
Lists of Olympic flag bearers
Parades in London